The 2019 Norwegian Women's Cup was the 42nd season of the Norwegian annual knock-out football tournament. It began with first round matches in April and May 2019. The first round was played between 22 April and 1 May and the tournament ended with the final which was held on 23 November 2019.

Calendar
Below are the dates for each round as given by the official schedule:

Source:

First round

|colspan="3" style="background-color:#97DEFF"|22 April 2019

|-
|colspan="3" style="background-color:#97DEFF"|25 April 2019

|-
|colspan="3" style="background-color:#97DEFF"|30 April 2019

|-
|colspan="3" style="background-color:#97DEFF"|1 May 2019

|}

Second round

|colspan="3" style="background-color:#97DEFF"|15 May 2019

 
|}

Third round

Quarter-finals

Semi-finals

Final

References

Norwegian Women's Cup seasons
Norwegian Women's Cup
Cup